The 2016–17 season was the 49th season of the Northern Premier League Premier Division, and the tenth season of the Northern Premier League Division One North and South. 
The League sponsors for 2016–17 were Evo-Stik.

The league constitution was announced on 12 May 2016.

Premier Division

The Premier Division featured six new clubs:
Coalville Town, promoted as playoff winners in NPL Division One South
Corby Town, relegated from National League North
Hednesford Town, relegated from National League North
Stafford Rangers, promoted as champions of NPL Division One South
Spennymoor Town, promoted as playoff winners in NPL Division One North
Warrington Town, promoted as champions of NPL Division One North

League table

Top scorers

Updated to match(es) played on 22 April 2017

Results

Play-offs

Semi-finals

Final

Stadia and locations

Division One North

Two Division One North clubs were moved to the parallel division: Northwich Victoria and Witton Albion were transferred to Division One South.

Thus, Division One North featured six new clubs:
Colne, promoted from the North West Counties League Premier Division
Colwyn Bay, relegated from the NPL Premier Division
Goole, transferred from NPL Division One South
Hyde United, relegated from the NPL Premier Division
Ramsbottom United, relegated from the NPL Premier Division
Tadcaster Albion, promoted from the Northern Counties East League Premier Division

League table

Top scorers

Updated to match(es) played on 22 April 2017

Results

Play-offs

Semi-finals

Final

Stadia and locations

Division One South

Division One South featured five new clubs:
AFC Rushden & Diamonds, transferred from Southern League Division One Central
Bedworth United, relegated from Southern League Premier Division
Northwich Victoria, transferred from NPL Division One North
Stamford, relegated from NPL Premier Division
Witton Albion, transferred from NPL Division One North

League table

Top scorers

Updated to match(es) played on 22 April 2017

Results

Play-offs

Semi-finals

Final

Stadia and locations

Challenge Cup

The 2016–17 Northern Premier League Challenge Cup, known as the 16–17 Integro Doodson League Cup for sponsorship reasons, was the 47th season of the Northern Premier League Challenge Cup, the main cup competition in the Northern Premier League. It was sponsored by Doodson Sport for a sixth consecutive season. 67 clubs from England and one from Wales entered the competition, beginning with the preliminary round, and all ties ended after 90 minutes and concluded with penalties.

The defending champions were Marine, who defeated Scarborough Athletic on penalties in the 2016 Final. They were eliminated in the first round.

Calendar

Preliminary round

First round

Second round

Third round

Quarterfinals

Semifinals

Final

See also
Northern Premier League
2016–17 Isthmian League
2016–17 Southern League

Notes

References

External links
Official website

Northern Premier League seasons
7